was a Japanese voice actor from Nagasaki Prefecture, Japan. He debuted in 1960, and was attached to the talent agency Arts Vision at the time of his death in 2013. He was one of the founding members of Theater Echo. He was best known for voicing Sengoku in One Piece.

Ishimori died on June 5, 2013 at the age of 81 from heart failure.

Filmography

Television animation
1960s
Star of the Giants (1968) – Sadaharu Oh
1970s
Demetan Croaker, The Boy Frog (1973) – Sawagani
Hurricane Polymar (1974) – Flider
Rascal the Raccoon (1977) – Herman Sunderland
Angie Girl (1978) – Barkley
The Story of Perrine (1978) – César
The Rose of Versailles (1979) – A bookseller
1980s
Ideon (1980) – Doba Ajiba
Super Dimension Century Orguss (1983) – Roberto
Mobile Suit Zeta Gundam (1985) – Franklin Bidan
Musashi no Ken (1985) – Gondou-sensei
Mobile Suit Gundam ZZ (1986) – Karahan
Manga Nihon Keizai Nyuumon (1987) – Funeoka
Mister Ajikko (1987) – Bravo Ojisan
Sally the Witch (1989) – Yoshiko's father
1990s
Kinkyū Hasshin Saver Kids (1991) – Matsugorou
Kinnikuman: Kinnikusei Oui Soudatsu-hen (1991) – Chairman Harabote; Dr. Bombay; Ashuraman (First); Pinchman
Jeanie with the Light Brown Hair (1992) – Big Joe
Madō King Granzort (1992) – Gus' grandfather
Super Bikkuriman (1992) – Super Zeus
Magic Knight Rayearth (1994) – Chang Ang as of episode 31
Mobile Fighter G Gundam (1994) – Zuisen
Wedding Peach (1995) – Daruma
Case Closed (1996) – Negishi, Shiota, Orita
Harimogu Harry (1996) – Principal Shirakansu
Kindaichi Case Files (1997) – Tsubaki
Master of Mosquiton '99 (1997) – Hopper
Pokémon (1997) – Babaa; Ghos (talking, ep 20); Santa Claus
Outlaw Star (1998) – Old Man
2000s
Hamtaro (2000) – Chourouhamu/Elder-Ham
PaRappa the Rapper (2001) – Santa Claus
Cyborg 009 (2002) – Dr. Eckerman
Galaxy Angel Z (2002) – Village Elder
One Piece (2003) – Fleet Admiral Sengoku
R.O.D the TV (2003) – Principal Uchida
Tetsujin 28-go (2004) – Chief Secretary
Buzzer Beater (2005) – Yoshimune
Gunparade March (2005) – Sea captain
Eureka Seven (2006) – Gonzy
Wan Wan Celeb Soreyuke! Tetsunoshin (2006) – Toranosuke Inuyama
Les Misérables: Shōjo Cosette (2007) – Fauchelevent
Moribito: Guardian of the Spirit (2007) – Hibitonan
2010s
Fullmetal Alchemist: Brotherhood (2010) – King of Xerxes
Psychic Detective Yakumo (2010) – Shinji Kunimatsu
Bunny Drop (2011) – Matsui

OVA
Dominion: Tank Police (1988) – Father (Chaplain)
Gunbuster (1988) – Principal
Ys (1989) – Klarze
Detonator Orgun (1991) – Foreston
K.O. Beast (1992) – Dr. Password
One Piece - Defeat The Pirate Ganzak! (1998) – Skid
Pocket Monsters: Pikachu's Winter Vacation 2000 (1999) – Santa
Pocket Monsters: Pikachu's Winter Vacation 2001 (2000) – Santa Claus
Murder Princess (2007) – Jodo Entolasia

Theatrical animation
Mobile Suit Gundam - The Movie Trilogy (1981) –  Reed
The Ideon: Be Invoked (1982) – Doba Ajiba
Doraemon: The Record of Nobita's Parallel Visit to the West (1988) – Kinkaku
Mobile Suit Gundam: Char's Counterattack (1988) – Clop Captain
Stink Bomb (1995) – Doctor
Mobile Suit Gundam - The Movie Trilogy (Special Edition) (2000) – Gopp
Princess Arete (2001) – Elder Counsellor
Millennium Actress (2002) – Clerk
Tetsujin 28-go: Morning Moon of Midday (2007) – Chief Cabinet Secretary

Tokusatsu
Seijuu Sentai Gingaman (1998) – Kugutsudayuu (ep. 17)

Video games
Mega Man 2: The Power Fighters (1996) – Dr. Light, Dr. Wily
Jeanne D'Arc (2006) – Duke of Bedford
Kingdom Hearts Birth by Sleep (2010) – Bashful

Dubbing

Live-action
Arachnophobia – Irv Kendall (Roy Brocksmith)
A Beautiful Mind – Helinger (Judd Hirsch)
The Big Brawl – Judge (Larry Drake)
Bill & Ted's Excellent Adventure – Socrates (Tony Steedman)
Bulletproof Monk – Bulletproof Monk (Mako Iwamatsu)
The Cannonball Run – Mel (Mel Tillis)
Dark City – Mr. Book (Ian Richardson)
Ed – Chubb (Jack Warden)
The Exorcist: Director's Cut – Father Lankester Merrin (Max von Sydow)
Exorcist: The Beginning – Jefferies (Alan Ford)
Fly Away Home – Dr. Killian (David Hemblen)
From Hell – Sir William Gull (Ian Holm)
Ghostbusters II (1998 TV Asahi edition) – Mayor "Lenny" (David Margulies)
Harry Potter and the Chamber of Secrets – Sorting Hat
Harry Potter and the Deathly Hallows – Part 2 – Sorting Hat
Harry Potter and the Philosopher's Stone – Sorting Hat
Independence Day – General William Grey (Robert Loggia)
The Money Pit – Walter Fielding Sr. (Douglass Watson)
The Negotiator (2001 TV Asahi edition) – Commander Grant Frost (Ron Rifkin)
Nemesis – Commissioner Farnsworth (Tim Thomerson)
On Deadly Ground – Hugh Palmer (Richard Hamilton)
Planet of the Apes – Senator Sandar (David Warner)
Ronin – Jean-Pierre (Michael Lonsdale)
Secret Window – Sheriff Dave Newsome (Len Cariou)
She-Wolf of London – Dad Matheson (Arthur Cox)
The Valachi Papers (1974 TV Asahi edition) – Lucky Luciano (Angelo Infanti)
Wall Street (1991 Fuji TV edition) – Lou Mannheim (Hal Holbrook)
Willy Wonka & the Chocolate Factory (2009 DVD edition) – Grandpa Joe (Jack Albertson)

Animation
Animaniacs – Albert Einstein
Who Framed Roger Rabbit – Baby Herman

Successors
Toru Okawa—One Piece: Sengoku
Akio Nojima—Police Story: prosecutor
Cho—Nintama Rantaro: Tada Dozen

References

External links
Takkō Ishimori's profile at Arts Vision 

1932 births
2013 deaths
Japanese male voice actors
Male voice actors from Nagasaki Prefecture
20th-century Japanese male actors
21st-century Japanese male actors
Arts Vision voice actors